The 1987–88 Xavier Musketeers men's basketball team represented Xavier University from Cincinnati, Ohio in the 1987–88 season. Led by head coach Pete Gillen, the Musketeers played their home games at Cincinnati Gardens in Cincinnati, Ohio. After opening the season 2–2, Xavier won 24 of its next 25 games on its way to winning regular season and MCC tournament titles. The team earned an automatic bid to the NCAA tournament as No. 11 seed in the Midwest region – despite a No. 18 ranking in the AP poll. In the NCAA tournament, the Musketeers fell in the opening round to No. 6 seed and eventual National champion Kansas, 85–72. Xavier finished with a 26–4 record (9–1 MCC).

Roster

Schedule and results

|-
!colspan=9 style=| Regular season

|-
!colspan=9 style=| Midwestern Collegiate Conference tournament

|-
!colspan=9 style=| NCAA Tournament

Rankings

Awards and honors
Byron Larkin – MCC Player of the Year

References

Xavier
Xavier Musketeers men's basketball seasons
Xavier